Brooklyn Steel is an 1800-capacity music venue in Brooklyn, New York, United States. In 2018 Brooklyn Steel was named one of the 10 best live music venues in America by Rolling Stone Magazine. 

Construction for the venue began in July 2016, and it opened on April 6, 2017, with a five-night run of sold-out concerts by American rock band LCD Soundsystem. The venue contains a main floor, a balcony, forty restrooms, and three bars. The name of the venue was inspired by the fact that the building was originally used as a steel manufacturing plant. Much of the steel from the original building was repurposed for the venue.

Critical reception
At opening, the venue was "easy to see…quickly becoming yet another Williamsburg cultural beacon". Media also compared the venue to Manhattan's Terminal 5, which is also operated by The Bowery Presents. Both venues are "effectively one big tall box" and Terminal 5 appeared to serve as a guide for Brooklyn Steel's construction.

Performers
Since the venue's opening in April 2017, musical acts have performed at the venue including Tiffany Young, Maren Morris, LCD Soundsystem, PJ Harvey, Laura Marling, Goldfrapp, Two Door Cinema Club, Regina Spektor, Catfish and the Bottlemen, Marian Hill, Pixies, Godspeed You! Black Emperor, Ween, Perfume Genius, The Decemberists, Nao, Animal Collective, Sunn0))), Franz Ferdinand, PUP, Wilco, MIKA, Theo Katzman, Weyes Blood and Arctic Monkeys.

References

External links

Music venues in Brooklyn
Buildings and structures in Brooklyn
Music venues completed in 2017
2017 establishments in New York City